Rappahannock Academy may refer to:

Rappahannock Academy, Virginia, an unincorporated community in Caroline County, Virginia
Rappahannock Academy & Military Institute, a defunct military academy 
Rappahannock Industrial Academy, a school for African Americans